Adam Shand is a New Zealand visual effects operations manager and advocate of community wireless networks.

Career
Shand founded Personal Telco in November 2000 which subsequently grew into one of the largest community wireless projects in the United States.
He is one of the original members of the Shmoo Group and the primary author of the Wireless Commons Manifesto.

In 2003 he moved back home to Wellington, New Zealand to work as a senior systems administrator, and later became the operations manager, for Weta Digital.

Visual effects
The company produced visual effects for the films:

 2011 The Adventures of Tintin (systems manager: Weta Digital) 
 2009 Avatar (systems manager: Weta Digital) 
 2009 The Lovely Bones (systems manager: Weta Digital) 
 2009 District 9 (systems manager: Weta Digital – uncredited) 
 2008 The Day the Earth Stood Still (lead systems engineer: Weta Digital) 
 2008 The Chronicles of Narnia: Prince Caspian (code operations manager: Weta Digital) 
 2008 Jumper (code operations manager: Weta Digital) 
 2007 The Water Horse (digital operations manager: weta digital) 
 2007 30 Days of Night (code operations manager) 
 2007 Fantastic 4: Rise of the Silver Surfer (code operations manager) 
 2007 Bridge to Terabithia (digital operations manager: weta digital) 
 2006 Eragon (digital operations manager: weta digital) 
 2006 X-Men: The Last Stand (digital operations manager: weta digital) 
 2005 King Kong (digital operations manager) 
 2004 I, Robot (systems administrator: Weta Digital) 
 2004 Van Helsing (senior systems administrator: Weta Digital – uncredited) 
 2003 The Lord of the Rings: The Return of the King (systems administrator: Weta Digital)

References

External links 
 http://adam.nz/
 http://www.personaltelco.net/
 

Living people
Year of birth missing (living people)
New Zealand mass media people
New Zealand film people
People from Wellington City